Milko may refer to:
Milkó, a commune in Vrancea County, Romania
Milko (name)
Milko (Swedish cooperative), Sweden's largest native producer of dairy products
 Somebody who operated a milk run

See also
Milka (given name), the female form of Milk
Milkor, a South African company
Miłków (disambiguation)
Miljko, a Serbian masculine given name
Melkor, a character from Tolkien's legendarium